On July 2, 1815, Representative-elect Amos Ellmaker (DR) of  resigned after being appointed and commissioned president judge of the Twelfth Judicial District of Pennsylvania, composed of the counties of Dauphin, Lebanon, and Schuylkill, and before the 14th Congress' first session began.  A special election was held on October 10, 1815 to fill the vacancy left by his resignation.

Election results

Wallace took his seat on December 4, 1815 at the start of the 1st session of the 14th Congress.

See also
List of special elections to the United States House of Representatives

References

Pennsylvania 1815 03
Pennsylvania 1815 03
1815 03
Pennsylvania 03
United States House of Representatives 03
United States House of Representatives 1815 03